Natalya Sokovnina (born 18 January 1990) is a Kazakhstani former professional racing cyclist.

Major results

2015
 3rd Time trial, National Road Championships
 7th Time trial, Asian Road Championships
2016
 2nd Road race, National Road Championships
 6th Time trial, Asian Road Championships
2017
 1st  Time trial, National Road Championships
 6th Time trial, Asian Road Championships

See also
 List of 2016 UCI Women's Teams and riders

References

External links
 
 

1990 births
Living people
Kazakhstani female cyclists
Place of birth missing (living people)
20th-century Kazakhstani women
21st-century Kazakhstani women